The 1940–41 Indiana Hoosiers men's basketball team represented Indiana University. Their head coach was Branch McCracken, who was in his 3rd year. The team played its home games in The Fieldhouse in Bloomington, Indiana, and was a member of the Big Ten Conference.

Coming off the program's first national championship, the Hoosiers finished the regular season with an overall record of 17–3 and a conference record of 10–2, finishing 2nd in the Big Ten Conference. Indiana was not invited to participate in any postseason tournament.

Roster

Schedule/Results

|-
!colspan=8| Regular Season
|-

References

Indiana Hoosiers
Indiana Hoosiers men's basketball seasons
1940 in sports in Indiana
1941 in sports in Indiana